Rhizocarpon macrosporum (lemon map lichen) is a smooth, bright yellow  crustose aereolate lichen found in the Sonoran Desert of California and Arizona, and in Africa and Asia.

It is very similar to R. geographicum except for the size of the spores. "Macrosporum" means "large spore".

The prothallus is black and often not distinct. The medulla is white.

References

Lichens described in 1943
Rhizocarpaceae
Lichen species
Lichens of Africa
Lichens of Asia
Lichens of the United States
Taxa named by Veli Räsänen
Fungi without expected TNC conservation status